Gerard Storey (born 2 May 2002) is an Irish footballer who plays as a midfielder for Annagh United on loan from Cliftonville.

Club career

Portadown
Storey made his Portadown debut on the 18 August 2018, coming off the bench in a 2–0 win versus PSNI.

Portsmouth
In May 2019, Storey signed for Portsmouth, joining up with their youth team on a 2-year scholarship deal.

On 16 September 2020, Storey joined Southern League side Gosport Borough on loan, he made 9 appearances without scoring before returning to Pompey during the Southern League's COVID break.

Storey made his Portsmouth debut against Cheltenham Town on the 8 December 2020, coming on as a sub in a 3–0 win in the EFL Trophy.

On 12 January 2021, Storey moved on loan to NIFL Premiership side Carrick Rangers.

During April 2021, it was announced that Storey had agreed to part ways with Portsmouth at the end of the season.

Career statistics

References

External links
Portsmouth FC profile

2002 births
Living people
Association footballers from Northern Ireland
Portadown F.C. players
Portsmouth F.C. players
Gosport Borough F.C. players
Carrick Rangers F.C. players
Derry City F.C. players
NIFL Premiership players
League of Ireland players
Association football midfielders